Baluch People's Liberation Front, also known as Baluch Awami Azadi Mahaiz or BPLF is a militant group formed by Mir Hazar Khan Marri, a prominent Baluchi leader in 1976, led by Sher Mohammad Marri. 

The group is currently believed to be active . However, it hasn't carried out any attack against the Pakistani Army and Government since 2006.

See also
 Balochistan conflict
 Balochistan Liberation Army
 Baloch Students Organization
 Balochistan Liberation Front
 Popular Front for Armed Resistance

References

Baloch nationalist militant groups
Balochistan
Rebel groups in Pakistan